The Claws of the Hun is a 1918 American silent drama film directed by Victor Schertzinger and written by Ella Stuart Carson and R. Cecil Smith. The film stars Charles Ray, Jane Novak, Robert McKim, Dorcas Matthews, Melbourne MacDowell, and Mollie McConnell. The film was released on June 30, 1918, by Paramount Pictures.

Plot
A propaganda film about a bad agent trying to find the secret formula for an explosive.

Cast
Charles Ray as John Stanton
Jane Novak as Virginia Lee
Robert McKim as Alfred Werner
Dorcas Matthews as Muriel Charters
Melbourne MacDowell as Godfrey Stanton
Mollie McConnell as Mrs. Godfrey Stanton
Henry A. Barrows

Reception
Like many American films of the time, The Claws of the Hun was subject to cuts by city and state film censorship boards. For example, the Chicago Board of Censors cut, in Reel 5, scene of man's hand in press, three scenes of man turning press, and shooting the American boy.

References

External links 
 

1918 films
1910s English-language films
Silent American drama films
1918 drama films
Paramount Pictures films
Films directed by Victor Schertzinger
American black-and-white films
American silent feature films
1910s American films